Juozapas Kukta (born 1873 in Trakiniai) was a Lithuanian clergyman and bishop for the Roman Catholic Diocese of Kaišiadorys. He was ordained in 1898. He was appointed bishop in 1926. He died in 1942.

References 

1873 births
1942 deaths
Lithuanian Roman Catholic bishops